Student Agency is a Czech travel agency whose main focuses are on au-pair programmes, resale of airline tickets, bus and rail transport. Its headquarters are in Brno, Czech Republic. Despite the company's name, their services are not sold exclusively to students. Student Agency is the sole owner of RegioJet, which operates bus and rail transport across the Czech Republic and Slovakia.

The company was founded by Radim Jančura, a graduate of the Brno University of Technology. Since its registration in 1996, Jančura has remained CEO and is the sole owner.

History

Initially the company dealt with mediating au-pair stays for students from the Czech Republic, later extending its sphere of activities to include:

 mediating language study programmes abroad (1996)
 mediating work programmes (1996)
 regular domestic bus transport (2004)
 sale of air tickets (2000)
 sale of tours and holidays (2010)

Within the transport field, Student Agency operated international bus transport from the start and since 2004 the company operated regular domestic lines.

On 24 February 2006, Student Agency was recognised in the TTG Travel Awards of 2005 as “Best flight (IATA) agency in the Czech Republic” and “Best bus transporter”. In the same year, CEO Jančura expressed in several interviews his intention to extend Student Agency's bus transport within 3 years and to also become a provider of rail.

The company RegioJet a.s. was incorporated in the Companies Register on 20 March 2009 with the subject of enterprise “production, business and services not stated in attachments 1 to 3 of the Trade Licensing Act” and on 6 October 2009 the subject of activity “operator of railway and railway transport” was registered. RegioJet is a private railway operator which competes with state-owned Czech and Slovak railways. They have been given the right to operate on Czech tracks and are one of the service providers on the Ostrava-Prague connection. They also offer train services in Slovakia and operate routes to other European cities, such as Vienna.

A sister company of the same name, RegioJet a.s., with its registered office in Bratislava was established in 2010 and is nowadays an operator of rail and bus transport in Slovakia.

From 2016, bus transport was included under the RegioJet brand. The company operates lines connecting Prague with Ostrava, Vienna (both via Brno), Plzeň, Liberec and Hradec Králové. The most frequent is the Prague - Brno line with round the clock time schedule. There are also many less frequent international lines to: London, Amsterdam, Eindhoven, Hamburg, Munich, Berlin, Stuttgart, Dresden, Paris, Košice, Budapest, Rome, Naples, Venice, Zurich, Bern, Geneve, Oslo and some other destinations.

Finances
The company's registered capital is only .

Notes

External links

Company website
Company website in Hungary
Company website in WorldWide

Travel and holiday companies of the Czech Republic
Companies based in Brno
Ticket sales companies
Bus companies of the Czech Republic